The Players Tour Championship 2010/2011 – Event 2 (also known as Star Xing Pai Players Tour Championship 2010/2011 – Event 2 for sponsorship purposes) was a professional minor-ranking snooker tournament that took place between 8–11 July 2010 at the World Snooker Academy in Sheffield, England.

Mark Selby won in the final 4–3 against Barry Pinches, despite at one point trailing 1–3.

Prize fund and ranking points
The breakdown of prize money and ranking points of the event is shown below:

1 Only professional players can earn ranking points.

Main draw

Preliminary round

Best of 7 frames

Main rounds

Top half

Section 1

Section 2

Section 3

Section 4

Bottom half

Section 5

Section 6

Section 7

Section 8

Finals

Final

Century breaks

 144, 138, 101  Judd Trump
 143  Jimmy White
 142, 133,  127, 125, 116, 111, 110, 102  Mark Selby
 140  Stephen Maguire
 137  Jamie Cope
 136  Jimmy Robertson
 135, 115  Joe Perry
 134  Tony Drago
 127, 110, 104, 103  Anthony McGill
 121  Bjorn Haneveer
 116, 100  Stuart Bingham
 115, 103, 102  Barry Pinches
 111  James McBain
 110  David Gilbert
 108, 102  David Gray

 108  Tom Ford
 106  Michael Wasley
 105  Paul Davison
 105  David Grace
 105  Ricky Walden
 104  Matthew Stevens
 102  Nick Jennings
 100  Gerard Greene
 100  Stuart Carrington
 100  Joe Swail
 100  Lee Spick
 100  Graeme Dott
 100  Ali Carter
 100  Patrick Wallace

References

2
2010 in English sport

sv:Players Tour Championship 2010/2011#Players Tour Championship 2